The Hawaiʻi Rainbow Warriors basketball team represents the University of Hawaiʻi at Mānoa in NCAA men's competition. (Women's sports teams at the school are known as Rainbow Wahine.) The team currently competes in the Big West Conference after leaving its longtime home of the Western Athletic Conference in July 2012. The team's most recent appearance in the NCAA Division I men's basketball tournament was in 2016, with them getting their first NCAA Tournament victory that same year as well. The Rainbow Warriors are coached by Eran Ganot.

Season-by-season results

Postseason history

NCAA tournament results
The Rainbow Warriors have appeared in five NCAA tournaments. Their combined record is 1–5.

NIT results
The Rainbow Warriors have appeared in eight National Invitational Tournaments (NIT). Their combined record is 10–8.

CIT results
The Rainbow Warriors have appeared in two CollegeInsider.com Postseason Tournament (CIT). They have a combined record of 1–2.

NAIA tournament results
The Rainbow Warriors have appeared in the NAIA Tournament one time. Their combined record is 0–1.

Coaches

Notable players

Retired numbers

The Rainbow Warriors retired their first number in program history on February 15, 2020, honoring number 33 for UH great and coach Bob Nash.

All-Americans
1971–1972: Bob Nash (Third team – "Basketball News", Honorable Mention – UPI, AP, Universal Sports)
1972–1973: Tom Henderson (Honorable Mention – NBA Coaches, Sporting News, Basketball Weekly)
1973–1974: Tom Henderson (First Team – Sporting News, NBA Coaches, Street & Smith's Basketball Yearbook, Citizens Savings Athletic Foundation) (Second Team – Basketball Weekly, Universal Sports), (Third Team- AP), (Honorable Mention-UPI)
1995–1996: Anthony Harris (Honorable Mention – Basketball Weekly)
1996–1997: Anthony Carter (Honorable Mention – AP)
1997–1998: Anthony Carter (Honorable Mention – AP)
2001–2002: Predrag Savović (Honorable Mention – AP)

NBA draft
1971: Tom Newell     – Round 10 – Phoenix Suns
1972: Bob Nash       – Round  1 – Detroit Pistons
1972: Dwight Holiday – Round  9 – Seattle SuperSonics
1973: John Penebacker – Round 13 – Cleveland Cavaliers
1974: Tom Henderson  – Round  1 – Atlanta Hawks
1975: Jimmie Baker   – Round  3 – Philadelphia 76ers
1975: Victor Kelly – Round 10 – Atlanta Hawks
1976: Tom Barker – Round  4 – Atlanta Hawks
1981: Aaron Strayhorn – Round  6 – Cleveland Cavaliers
1982: Clarence Dickerson – Round 5 – Washington Bullets
1989: Reggie Cross – Round  2 – Philadelphia 76ers

NBA free agents
Anthony Carter
Trevor Ruffin
Predrag Savović

NBA champions
Phil Handy

EuroLeague and international players
Jared Dillinger
Carl English
Isaac Fotu
Stefan Janković
Vander Joaquim
Matt Lojeski
Sammis Reyes (born 1995), Chilean player who played for the Chilean national basketball team and later switched to American football by the 2020s
Christian Standhardinger
Aaron Valdes (born 1993)
Luc-Arthur Vebobe

Facilities
The Rainbow Warriors play at the 10,300 seat Stan Sheriff Center, which opened in 1994. Originally called the "Special Events Arena" it was renamed in 1998 after Stan Sheriff, the former UH Athletics Director, who had lobbied for its construction. Previously, the team had played from 1964–1994 at the 7,500 seat Neal S. Blaisdell Center (originally the Honolulu International Center) and prior to that at the "Otto "Proc" Klum Gymnasium".

See also
 Hawaii Rainbow Wahine basketball

References

External links